The Ultimate Accessory is a 2013 French comedy film directed by Valérie Lemercier.

Cast
 Valérie Lemercier as Aleksandra Cohen-Le Foulon
 Gilles Lellouche as Cyrille Cohen
 Marina Foïs as Sophie
 Brigitte Roüan as Martine
 Chantal Ladesou as Danielle
 Gérard Darmon as The doctor
 Bruno Podalydès as Pierre Dutertre 
 Brigitte Roüan as Martine 
 Anne Benoît as The DDASS lady
 Pierre Vernier
 Olivier Broche

Reception
Judith Prescott from Frenchcinemareview.com objected in her review "clichès" and judged altogether the film would not "do justice" 
to Valérie Lemercier's "talent".

References

External links
 

2013 films
French comedy films
2013 comedy films
2010s French films